Durfort may refer to:

Places

Durfort is the name or part of the name of several communes in France:

 Durfort, Ariège, in the Ariège département
 Durfort, Tarn, in the Tarn département
 Durfort-et-Saint-Martin-de-Sossenac, in the Gard département
 Durfort-Lacapelette, in the Tarn-et-Garonne département

People

 Durfort (family)